{{chembox
| verifiedrevid = 400308223
| ImageFile1 = Methyl blue.png
| ImageFile2 = Methyl Blue 3D.png
| ImageFileL2 = Sample of Methyl Blue.jpg
| ImageCaptionL2 = Solid methyl blue
| ImageFileR2 = Methyl Blue aqueous solution.jpg
| ImageCaptionR2 = Methyl blue aqueous solution
| IUPACName = 
| OtherNames = Cotton blue, Helvetia blue, Acid blue 93, C.I. 42780|Section1=
|Section2=
|Section3=
}}Methyl blue''' is a chemical compound with the molecular formula C37H27N3Na2O9S3. It is used as a stain in histology, and stains collagen blue in tissue sections. It can be used in some differential staining techniques such as Mallory's connective tissue stain and Gömöri trichrome stain, and can be used to mediate electron transfer in microbial fuel cells. Fungal cell walls are also stained by methyl blue.

Methyl blue is also available in mixture with water blue, under name Aniline Blue WS, Aniline blue, China blue, or Soluble blue; and in a solution of phenol, glycerol, and lactic acid under the name Lactophenol cotton blue (LPCB), which is used for microscopic visualization of fungi.

Chemistry 
Methyl blue ([[4-[Bis[4-[(sulfophenyl)amino]phenyl]methylene]-2,5-cyclohexadien-1-ylidene]amino]-benzenesulfonic acid disodium salt) is distinctly different to methylene blue ([7-(dimethylamino)phenothiazin-3-ylidene]-dimethylazanium;chloride) in structure, function and uses, and must not be confused

Its uses include staining histology samples for collagen, and for fungal structures.

See also
 Potassium ferrocyanide
 Potassium ferricyanide
 Methylene blue
 Egyptian blue
 Han Purple
 Crystal violet
 Fluorescein

References

Triarylmethane dyes
Staining dyes
Aromatic amines
Acid dyes